The Beach District is a district of the Virginia High School League.  The schools in the Beach District compete in the 6A and 5A divisions.

Facts about the District
As its name implies, the Beach District is composed solely of all 11 public high schools in Virginia Beach.  It is also the largest district in terms of membership in the Virginia High School League.  As a result in some sports, there are no non-district games, in particular for football, where there are only 10 games in the regular season.

Member schools
Bayside High School of Virginia Beach, Virginia
First Colonial High School of Virginia Beach, Virginia
Frank W. Cox High School of Virginia Beach, Virginia
Floyd Kellam High School of Virginia Beach, Virginia
Green Run High School of Virginia Beach, Virginia
Kempsville High School of Virginia Beach, Virginia
Landstown High School of Virginia Beach, Virginia
Ocean Lakes High School of Virginia Beach, Virginia
Princess Anne High School of Virginia Beach, Virginia
Salem High School of Virginia Beach, Virginia
Tallwood High School of Virginia Beach, Virginia

External links
 VHSL-Reference

Aaa Beach District
Aaa Beach District
Education in Virginia Beach, Virginia